Paul Richardson is a British businessman and entrepreneur. He is the former co-owner of AllSaints, the former executive director and chairman of Gymshark, and is executive chairman of streetwear brand HERA.

Early life 
Richardson has a run various waste management services. In 1992, Richardson founded City Waste. The company would go on to become the largest waste management and recycling company in the West Midlands with a turnover in excess of £10 million. City Waste was sold to SITA in 2002 for an eight figure sum.

AllSaints 
In 2000, Richardson co-bought fashion retailer AllSaints out of administration and joined the board as a director. During his time at AllSaints, Richardson helped develop the company’s business model, with a focus on national expansion. By the time he sold his stake in the company in 2004, AllSaints had expanded to 10 stores across the UK.

Gymshark 
In 2013, Richardson met with Gymshark co-founders Ben Francis and Lewis Morgan who enlisted his help in growing their new fitness apparel business. Richardson later joined Gymshark as executive chairman in 2015 and played a key role in the company's growth and international expansion, with his appointment alongside Steve Hewitt described by Francis as helping to “revolutionise” the business.

Buoyed by an increase in revenue and recruitment, Gymshark expanded its regional headquarters in Solihull in 2020. Later in the year, the company secured investment from private equity firm General Atlantic. The deal saw Gymshark’s valuation surpass £1 billion, with the company becoming only the second in the UK to achieve unicorn status with no prior funding or investment.

In 2020, Richardson and two other shareholders sold 21% of their Gymshark stake to General Atlantic for around £250 million. The company would continue to build on the global foundations laid by Richardson and Hewitt, expanding its presence in the US market the following year with the opening of a new regional headquarters in Denver.

Other ventures 
In January 2014, Richardson became a director at Knowaste, a waste management company that he had worked with since 2008. In his time at Knowaste, Richardson evolved the business model and brought AHP recycling to the market with the development of the first commercial AHP recycling facilities in the UK.

In 2021, Richardson acquired Long Itchington and Ufton Woods, a 200-acre woodland which is a Site of Special Scientific Interest (SSSI), as well as a 200-acre woodland in East Hareshaw, Scotland and a 228-acre farm in Warwickshire.

In October 2021, Richardson returned to the fashion retail sector, acquiring streetwear brand HERA and becoming the company’s executive chairman in the process. Focusing on digital growth, Richardson has ambitions to grow the company to £100 million turnover by 2027.

Birmingham City Football Club 
In February 2002, Richardson joined the board of his boyhood football club, Birmingham City Football Club, as non-executive director. He carried out this role until May 2004, acting as an advisor to the senior management team during the club’s first two seasons in the Premier League.

In July 2022, Richardson launched a takeover bid for Birmingham City alongside former footballer Maxi López, at a reported fee of £35 million. The takeover was awaiting EFL approval, however the consortium pulled out of negotiations in December 2022 after failing to agree revised terms with the owners.

References 

Year of birth missing (living people)
Living people